Wide and narrow (sometimes un-stacked and stacked, or wide and tall) are terms used to describe two different presentations for tabular data.

Wide 
Wide, or unstacked data is presented with each different data variable in a separate column.

Narrow 

Narrow, stacked, or long data is presented with one column containing all the values and another column listing the context of the value

This is often easier to implement; addition of a new field does not require any changes to the structure of the table, however it can be harder for people to understand.

Implementations 
Many statistical and data processing systems have functions to convert between these two presentations, for instance the R programming language has several packages such as the tidyr package. The pandas package in Python implements this operation as "melt" function which converts a wide table to a narrow one. The process of converting a narrow table to wide table is generally referred to as "pivoting" in the context of data transformations. The "pandas" python package provides a "pivot" method which provides for a narrow to wide transformation.

See also 
 Abstract data type
 Pivot table
 Table (information)
 Information graphics
 Row (database)
 Table (database)
 Table (HTML)

References

External links 

 https://tidyr.tidyverse.org/articles/pivot.html
 https://cran.r-project.org/web/packages/reshape

Statistical data types
Descriptive statistics
Data modeling